Christin Hinojosa (married name Kirschenbaum; born October 3, 1975) is an American actress best known for her role as Sabrina in Dazed and Confused. After a few other small roles in films and on television, Hinojosa left acting in the late 1990s and became an anti-war activist. In 2004, as a member of the American Friends Service Committee, she was the first coordinator of the Eyes Wide Open installation in Chicago. She currently works as Director of Communications for Solidarity Bridge, a Christian medical charity focused on Latin America.

Filmography
 Dazed and Confused (1993) – Sabrina Davis
 Roseanne and Tom: Behind the Scenes (1994) (TV) – Jennifer
 The Computer Wore Tennis Shoes (1995) (TV) – Penelope
 Pride & Joy – "Brenda's Secret" (1995) (TV) – Laughing Nanny
 Clueless (1996) (TV) – Lillia
 The Love Bug (1997) (TV) – Trendy Gal

References

External links

American film actresses
1976 births
Living people
American anti–Iraq War activists
21st-century American actresses